Nathan Dempsey (born July 14, 1974) is a Canadian former professional ice hockey defenceman. He last played 260 games in the National Hockey League with the Toronto Maple Leafs, Chicago Blackhawks, Los Angeles Kings and the Boston Bruins .

Playing career
Nathan Dempsey was selected in the 11th round, 245th overall, in the 1992 NHL Entry Draft by the Toronto Maple Leafs from the WHL's Regina Pats.

Dempsey spent the majority of his 9-year tenure with the Leafs with their AHL affiliate, the St. John's Maple Leafs. His most successful season came in the 2001–02 season where he scored 61 points in 75 games for St. John's. Dempsey had only played 48 games for Toronto when he left as a free agent on July 12, 2002, signing with the Chicago Blackhawks.

Nathan established himself as a NHL regular in the Blackhawks blueline in the 2003–04 season and on March 2, 2004, he was traded from the Blackhawks to the Los Angeles Kings for a 4th round draft selection (Nathan Davis) in 2005 and future considerations.

Dempsey spent the 2004 NHL lockout with German team Eisbären Berlin of the DEL, before returning to the Kings for the 2005–06 season.

Dempsey joined his fourth NHL team on August 7, 2006, when he signed with the Boston Bruins. He spent the majority of the year in the minors with AHL affiliate the Providence Bruins.

On July 10, 2007, Dempsey signed with Swiss team, SC Bern of the NLA for his last professional season.

Personal life

At age 37, Dempsey was diagnosed with Parkinson`s Disease. He still plays hockey, coaches and works at Edmonton`s Vimy Ridge Hockey Academy.

Career statistics

Awards and honours

References

External links

1974 births
Living people
Boston Bruins players
Canadian ice hockey defencemen
Canadian expatriate ice hockey players in Germany
Canadian expatriate ice hockey players in Switzerland
Canadian expatriate ice hockey players in the United States
Chicago Blackhawks players
Eisbären Berlin players
Ice hockey people from Alberta
Los Angeles Kings players
People from Spruce Grove
Providence Bruins players
Regina Pats players
SC Bern players
St. John's Maple Leafs players
Toronto Maple Leafs draft picks
Toronto Maple Leafs players